Dugumenu Island is an island in Papua New Guinea. It is a member of the Marshall Bennett Islands and therefore belongs to Milne Bay Province.

References

Woodlark Islands
Islands of Milne Bay Province